Lee Jung-moon (born 18 March 1998) is a South Korean footballer who plays for K League 2 side Seoul E-Land.

Career statistics

Club

References

1998 births
Living people
Footballers from Seoul
South Korean footballers
South Korea under-20 international footballers
Association football utility players
Daejeon Hana Citizen FC players
Jeju United FC players
Seoul E-Land FC players
K League 2 players
K League 1 players
Yonsei University alumni